The Barentshav class of offshore patrol vessels consists of three vessels powered by liquefied natural gas. Ordered for the Norwegian Coast Guard, their main tasks are EEZ patrol, fishery inspection, search and rescue as well as tug readiness along the shore of Norway which is seeing increasing traffic from tankers.

Design 
The vessels are of the Vik-Sandvik design VS 794 CGV, and were built by Myklebust Verft and operated by Remøy Management on behalf of the Norwegian Coast Guard.

The Coast Guard expects a 90% decrease in  fume releases, and a 20% decrease in  releases compared to a conventionally powered vessel of similar size.

The ships replace NoCGV Chieftain,  and Stålbas. Stålbas lease contract expired at the end of 2006, Tromsøs on 20 March 2007, and Chieftains at the end of 2007.  was delivered in August 2009, Bergen in late 2009/early 2010 and Sortland in 2010.

The Barentshav class is equipped for the NATO Submarine Rescue System.

Vessels

See also

External links 
Naming of the first ship in the class, NoCGV Barentshav
Article with picture animation from Norwegian Armed Forces
Coast Guard vessel on gas
Remoy Management orders gas-fuelled coast guard vessel based on VS design
Gas-coast guard number three

 
Patrol ship classes
Patrol vessels
Patrol vessels of the Norwegian Coast Guard
Experimental ships